Sondra is a genus of Australian jumping spiders that was first described by F. R. Wanless in 1988.

Species
 it contains fifteen species, found in Western Australia, South Australia, Queensland, and New South Wales:
Sondra aurea (L. Koch, 1880) – Australia (New South Wales)
Sondra bickeli Zabka, 2002 – Australia (New South Wales)
Sondra bifurcata Wanless, 1988 – Australia (Queensland)
Sondra brindlei Zabka, 2002 – Australia (New South Wales)
Sondra bulburin Wanless, 1988 – Australia (Queensland)
Sondra convoluta Wanless, 1988 – Australia (Queensland)
Sondra damocles Wanless, 1988 – Australia (Queensland)
Sondra excepta Wanless, 1988 – Australia (Queensland)
Sondra finlayensis Wanless, 1988 – Australia (Queensland)
Sondra littoralis Wanless, 1988 – Australia (Queensland)
Sondra nepenthicola Wanless, 1988 (type) – Australia (Queensland, New South Wales)
Sondra raveni Wanless, 1988 – Australia (Queensland)
Sondra samambrayi Zabka, 2002 – Australia (South Australia)
Sondra tristicula (Simon, 1909) – Australia (Western Australia)
Sondra variabilis Wanless, 1988 – Australia (Queensland)

References

Salticidae genera
Salticidae
Spiders of Australia